This is a list of notable commercial satellite navigation software (also known as GPS software) for various devices, with a specific focus on mobile phones, tablets, tablet PCs, (Android, iOS, Windows).

Discontinued
 Garmin Mobile XT; (compatible with Symbian)
 Mapopolis Navigator

See also
Comparison of free off-line satellite navigation software
Comparison of web map services

References

Satellite navigation
GPS software, Commercial
Mobile software